Elena Bovina and Rennae Stubbs were the defending champions, but had different outcomes. While Bovina did not compete this year, Stubbs partnered with Cara Black and successfully defended her title, defeating Elena Likhovtseva and Magdalena Maleeva 6–0, 6–1 in the final. It was the 2nd title in the year for the pair, and the 14th title for Black and 44th title for Stubbs, in their respective careers.

Seeds

Draw

Draw

External links
 Main and Qualifying Draws

Toray Pan Pacific Open Doubles
2004 Women's Doubles
2004 Toray Pan Pacific Open